Taku Bamba (番場琢 - Bamba Taku; born January 30, 1982) is a Japanese professional racing driver.

Complete Super GT results 
(key) (Races in bold indicate pole position) (Races in italics indicate fastest lap)

References 

1982 births
Living people
Japanese racing drivers
Super GT drivers
21st-century Japanese people